The Spartan crow (Euploea lacon) is a species of nymphalid butterfly in the Danainae subfamily. It is endemic to Papua New Guinea.

References

Euploea
Insects of Papua New Guinea
Taxonomy articles created by Polbot